Upson County Railroad Company was the successor by change of name to the Thomaston and Barnesville Railroad Company. Thomaston and Barnesville Railroad Company was incorporated on December 23, 1839 by special act of the Georgia General Assembly.

In 1856, Thomaston and Barnesville Railroad Company constructed  of  gauge railroad line between Thomaston, Georgia and Barnesville, Georgia.

On December 6, 1860, Upson County Railroad was incorporated by special act of the Georgia General Assembly, which amended the charter and changed the name of the company from Thomaston and Barnesville Railroad Company.

In 1869, the Central Railroad and Banking Company of Georgia acquired control of the Upson County Railroad through ownership of a majority of the capital stock.

The Upson County Railroad was destroyed during the American Civil War and was rebuilt in 1870. The company's property was operated by Central Railroad and Banking Company of Georgia from that year forward.

Upson County Railroad was sold to Central of Georgia Railway Company on February 2, 1914.

See also 

 Confederate railroads in the American Civil War

Notes

References 
 Interstate Commerce Commission. Central of Georgia Railway Co., Volume 130, Interstate Commerce Commission Reports, p. 43 et seq. Washington: United States Government Printing Office.
Poor, Henry V. Manual of the Railroads of the United States for 1885. New York: J. J. Little and Company, 1885.

Defunct Georgia (U.S. state) railroads
Predecessors of the Central of Georgia Railway
Railway companies established in 1839
Railway companies disestablished in 1914
1839 establishments in Georgia (U.S. state)
5 ft gauge railways in the United States
American companies established in 1839